Stokksundet may refer to:

 Stokksundet (Larvik), a strait in the municipality of Larvik in Vestfold og Telemark county, Norway
 Stokksundet (Møre og Romsdal), a strait in the municipality of Herøy in Møre og Romsdal county, Norway
 Stokksundet (Trøndelag), a strait in the municipality of Åfjord in Trøndelag county, Norway
 Stokksundet (Vestland), a sound between the islands of Bømlo and Stord in Vestland county, Norway

See also
 Stokksund, a former municipality in Sør-Trøndelag county, Norway